Lehigh Valley Health Network is a healthcare network based in the Allentown, Pennsylvania in the Lehigh Valley region of eastern Pennsylvania. The healthcare network serves eastern and northeastern Pennsylvania. Its flagship hospital is Lehigh Valley Hospital–Cedar Crest, located on Cedar Crest Boulevard in Allentown.

History
LVHN has 981 licensed-acute beds on its three campuses.  In 2007, there were 50,070 admissions, 14,319 inpatient surgeries, 453,477 outpatient visits, 14,841 outpatient surgeries, 119,017 ER visits, and 3,184 births in network hospitals.
LVHN operates the third largest heart surgery program in Pennsylvania with more than 1,200 open-heart procedures performed each year. Pennsylvania's first Level One Trauma Center was at Lehigh Valley Hospital–Cedar Crest and this trauma center remains the only Level I trauma center in the Lehigh Valley with additional qualifications in pediatric trauma.  The LVHN Cancer Center is the fourth largest in Pennsylvania and cares for more than 2,400 new patients each year. 

In fiscal year 2014, LVHN's operating income increased by $9 million to $42 million. Acute admissions were up more than 2 percent to 55,000. Also up were emergency room visits, which increased 7 percent to 190,000. In 2014, the not-for-profit LVHN increased its community benefit - a combination of free care, reduced-cost care, education and other efforts that make up the foundation of the network's not-for-profit status - by 8 percent to $354 million. That supported more than 11,000 free flu shots distributed at Dorney Park & Wildwater Kingdom in South Whitehall Township and Coca-Cola Park in Allentown, and a dental van that provides free care to more than 1,000 children yearly. The benefit also helps to cover the growing differential between health care costs and how much Medicaid and Medicare are willing to reimburse.

Merger with Pocono Health System
In May 2015, the parent companies of Pocono Health System and Lehigh Valley Health Network announced they have agreed to merge. The planned merger was approved by both corporations' boards of directors in separate meetings. The merger is expected to be finalized early in 2016 following "due diligent" discussions of respective service delivery and financial issues, negotiation of final merger documents and government regulatory approvals.

On January 1, 2017, a full asset merger of Pocono Health System and flagship hospital, Pocono Medical Center, by Lehigh Valley Health Network was completed. Pocono Health System is now LVHN-Pocono and Pocono Medical Center now Lehigh Valley Hospital-Pocono.

Locations
Tracing its roots back to Allentown Hospital, founded in 1899, LVHN currently consists of eight hospital campuses, physicians practices and groups, clinics, testing and imaging centers, health centers and urgent care locations. The hospital campuses are
 Lehigh Valley Hospital–Cedar Crest – Cedar Crest
 Combined Adult Level I / Pediatric Level II trauma center
 Lehigh Valley Hospital–Muhlenberg
 Lehigh Valley Hospital–17th Street
 Lehigh Valley Hospital–Hazleton
 Level IV trauma center
 Lehigh Valley Hospital–Pocono
 Level III trauma center
 Lehigh Valley Hospital–Schuylkill
 Lehigh Valley Hospital–Hecktown Oaks
 Lehigh Valley Hospital–Dickson City
 Lehigh Valley Hospital–Carbon

References

External links
 

Companies based in Allentown, Pennsylvania
Healthcare in Pennsylvania
Hospital networks in the United States
Lehigh County, Pennsylvania
Companies based in the Lehigh Valley
Medical and health organizations based in Pennsylvania